Koba is a sweet made from ground peanuts, brown sugar and rice flour. It is a traditional food of Madagascar (where it is also known as kobandravina), especially in the highlands. In marketplaces and gas stations one may find vendors selling koba akondro, a sweet made by wrapping a batter of ground peanuts, mashed bananas, honey and corn flour in banana leaves and steaming or boiling the small cakes until the batter has set.

Variations
Part of the Malagasy cuisine of Madagascar, koba akondro is sold in marketplaces and gas stations by vendors. It is made by wrapping a batter of ground peanuts, mashed bananas, honey and corn flour in banana leaves and steaming or boiling the small cakes until the batter has set. Peanut brittle is also sold.

See also
 List of peanut dishes

References

External links
 Instructional video of koba akondro preparation

Confectionery
Malagasy cuisine
Peanut dishes